Rivo may refer to:

People
 Peter de Rivo (1420–1490), Flemish scholastic philosopher
 Radulph of Rivo, Dutch Roman Catholic historian and liturgist
 Rivo Rakotovao (born 1960), Malagasy politician
 Rivo Vesik (born 1980), Estonian beach volleyball player
 Rivo Andriamamonjy (born 1963), French volleyball player

Places
 Rivo or Rvo, Azerbaijan
 , Italy
 , Italy
 Rivo Alto Island, United States

Other
 Volkswagen Rivo